Samuel Hammond (1757–1842) was an American Revolutionary War officer and U.S. Representative from Georgia.

Samuel Hammond may also refer to:
 Samuel H. Hammond (1809–1878), American lawyer, author, newspaper editor and politician from New York
 Samuel M. Hammond (1870–1934), American football coach and physician
 Samuel Hammond (minister) (died 1665), Church of England minister and nonconformist
 Samuel Hammond Jr. (1949–1968), American student killed in the 1968 Orangeburg massacre